Roderick Johnson (born November 28, 1995) is an American football offensive tackle for the Philadelphia Eagles of the National Football League (NFL). He played college football at Florida State, and was drafted by the Cleveland Browns in the fifth round of 2017 NFL Draft.

Early years
Johnson attended Hazelwood Central High School in Florissant, Missouri, where he played high school football. He was rated as a four-star recruit and was considered among the top offensive tackles in his class. He committed to Florida State University to play college football.

College career
Johnson entered his true freshman year at Florida State in 2014 as a backup, but moved into the starting lineup for the final five games. He started every game at left tackle for Florida State as a sophomore in 2015 and was the winner of the Jacobs Blocking Trophy.

Professional career

Cleveland Browns
Johnson was drafted by the Cleveland Browns in the fifth round, 160th overall, in the 2017 NFL Draft. He signed a four-year contract with the Browns on May 10, 2017. On September 4, 2017, Johnson was placed on injured reserve.

Johnson was waived by the Browns on June 19, 2018, without ever appearing in a game for the Browns.

Houston Texans
On June 20, 2018, Johnson was claimed off waivers by the Houston Texans. He was waived on September 1, 2018 and was signed to the practice squad the next day. He was promoted to the active roster on September 12, 2018. He was waived on October 4, 2018 and was re-signed to the practice squad. He was promoted back to the active roster on December 8, 2018.

In 2019, Johnson played in all 16 games, starting three games, two at right tackle and one at left tackle.

Johnson re-signed with the Texans on a one-year contract on March 21, 2020. He re-signed with the team again on April 9, 2021. He was released on August 18.

Miami Dolphins
On September 20, 2021, Johnson was signed to the Miami Dolphins practice squad.

Kansas City Chiefs
On January 19, 2022, Johnson was signed to the Kansas City Chiefs practice squad. He signed a reserve/future contract with the Chiefs on February 2, 2022. He was released on August 27, 2022.

Philadelphia Eagles
Johnson was signed to the practice squad of the Philadelphia Eagles on September 28, 2022.

References

External links
Florida State Seminoles bio

1995 births
Living people
African-American players of American football
American football offensive tackles
Cleveland Browns players
Florida State Seminoles football players
Houston Texans players
Kansas City Chiefs players
Miami Dolphins players
Philadelphia Eagles players
People from Florissant, Missouri
Players of American football from Missouri
Sportspeople from St. Louis County, Missouri
21st-century African-American sportspeople